William Sedgwick may refer to:

 William Sedgwick (bishop) (1858–1948), Anglican bishop of Waiapu 
 William Sedgwick (priest) (1610–1669), English clergyman of Puritan views and mystical tendencies
 William Thompson Sedgwick (1855–1921), American public health specialist